Greg West may refer to:

 Greg West (cricketer) (born 1994), Australian cricketer
 Greg West (singer), contestant on the UK TV series The X Factor
 Greg West (Home and Away)
 Greg West (skeleton racer)